General elections were held in Zanzibar on 31 October 2010 alongside the 2010 Tanzanian general elections. Amani Abeid Karume the president of Zanzibar stepped down after completing 2 terms in office. The presidential elections were won by Ali Mohamed Shein of Chama Cha Mapinduzi. Zanzibar elections have always been highly contests and have always been subject to post election violence.

To defuse the tensions a Unity government to be formed after the election was proposed, which was put into place after the 2010 Zanzibari government of national unity referendum was overwhelmingly accepted by the population.

Results

President

House of Representatives

See also
2010 Tanzanian general election

References

Zanzibar
Elections in Tanzania
October 2010 events in Africa
Presidential elections in Tanzania